Vladimir Andreyev may refer to:

 Vladimir Andreyev (fencer) (1878–1940), Russian Olympic fencer
 Vladimir Andreyev (racewalker) (born 1966), Russian race walker
 Vladimir Andreyev (skier) (born 1958), retired Soviet alpine skier
 Vladimir Andreev (basketball) (born 1945), retired Russian basketball player
 Vladimir Andreyev (actor) (born 1930), Soviet and Russian theater and film actor